Luntley is a surname. Notable people with the surname include:

Edwin Luntley (1857–1921), English footballer
John Luntley, Welsh Anglican priest
Michael Luntley (born 1953), British philosopher and professor

See also
Huntley (name)
Lutley

English-language surnames